William Andrew Michael Junior Nylander Altelius (born 1 May 1996) is a Canadian-born Swedish professional ice hockey right winger for the Toronto Maple Leafs of the National Hockey League (NHL). Nylander was selected by the Maple Leafs in the first round, eighth overall, of the 2014 NHL Entry Draft.

Playing career
As a youth, Nylander played in the 2009 Quebec International Pee-Wee Hockey Tournament with the New York Rangers minor ice hockey team.

On 14 February 2013, Nylander made his Allsvenskan debut. Playing alongside his father Michael Nylander with Södertälje SK, he earned an assist in his first professional game on a goal by Robert Carlsson. Nylander closed out his 2013–14 season with a successful 22-game rookie stint in the Swedish Hockey League (SHL), where he would play as many as 20 minutes per night. Ranked as a top prospect in the 2014 NHL Entry Draft, he was ultimately selected eighth overall by the Toronto Maple Leafs.

Toronto Maple Leafs
After being drafted eighth overall, on 18 August 2014, the Maple Leafs announced that they had signed Nylander to a three-year, entry-level contract.

Nylander impressed early, scoring a pre-season goal against the Philadelphia Flyers. Later, at the 2015 World Junior Ice Hockey Championship, Nylander finished fifth in tournament scoring, the highest of any player not playing for Canada. Nylander was reassigned to the Maple Leafs' American Hockey League (AHL) affiliate, the Toronto Marlies, on 12 January 2015 to further his development. Nylander experienced a sensational campaign despite joining the AHL squad mid-season, scoring 32 points in 37 games playing on the right-wing. He was vital in helping the Marlies, who were at the bottom of the standings prior to Nylander joining, reach the 2015 Calder Cup playoffs. Although he left Modo Hockey after 21 games in the 2014–15 SHL season, Nylander was mentioned as a possible candidate for the SHL Rookie of the Year award.

Nylander made his NHL debut on 29 February 2016 against the Tampa Bay Lightning at age 19. He scored his first goal on 5 March 2016 against Andrew Hammond of the Ottawa Senators. His first NHL goal was assisted by Brooks Laich, who also assisted William's father Michael on his last NHL goal.

The next season, Nylander made the Maple Leafs roster full-time. He debuted alongside Zach Hyman and Auston Matthews on 12 October 2016 in the season opener against the Ottawa Senators. Nylander quickly found chemistry with his linemates, helping Matthews set an NHL record for most goals scored in a rookie's debut with four by assisting on two of the goals. On 1 November 2016, Nylander was named Rookie of the Month by NHL for the month of October. He had recorded eleven points in nine games, which was good enough for second in league scoring and first among rookie players. After his hot start in October, Nylander struggled in November, scoring only 5 points in 13 games. He had a nine-game goalless stretch between 27 October and 15 November. Nylander recovered, scoring twice in three games, but then went on another scoreless stretch, not hitting the twine between 22 November and 22 December, a span of 13 games. Nylander scored in back-to-back games to end the drought. He scored his first NHL career hat-trick on 4 February 2017 against the Boston Bruins. Nylander's 61 points helped the Leafs qualify for the 2017 Stanley Cup playoffs, where they were eliminated in six games by the Washington Capitals.

During the 2017–18 season, Nylander was again placed on the top line with Matthews and Hyman. Early in the season, Nylander went on an 11-game scoring drought, which ended in an overtime goal against the New Jersey Devils. By scoring that goal, Nylander became only the second Maple Leaf in franchise history (the first being Miroslav Fryčer) to score the only goal of a regular-season game in overtime. He ended the regular season recording 61 points, the same as his rookie season. The Maple Leafs once again qualified for the playoffs, where they were eliminated in seven games of the first round by the Boston Bruins. He recorded one goal and three assists during those seven games.

Nylander became a restricted free agent during the off-season. He went unsigned throughout the summer, seeking a long-term extension as opposed to a "bridge deal". Nylander did not attend the team's training camp. The Maple Leafs began the season without Nylander, as the two sides could not come to an agreement beforehand. As a restricted free agent, Nylander needed to sign before 1 December to be eligible to play during the 2018–19 season. While away from the team, Nylander skated in Sweden and Austria. It was reported that he was losing $30,000 in pay each day he remained unsigned. It was later reported on 10 November that the Maple Leafs were fielding offers for Nylander, just weeks before the 1 December deadline. Just minutes before the deadline, Nylander agreed to a six-year, $41.77 million contract. Nylander was a healthy scratch for his first game back with the team, but made his season debut on 6 December against the Detroit Red Wings. After his return, Nylander finished 5th in the annual NHLPA player poll for best hair in the league. He would struggle for the remainder of that season, scoring 27 points in 54 games.

Nylander's play markedly improved the following season, especially following the Leafs' decision to replace Mike Babcock as head coach with Sheldon Keefe. At the time the NHL was suspended due to the COVID-19 pandemic, Nylander had already set a career high with 31 goals in 68 games, to go along with 28 assists.

International play

Despite being born in Canada, on 12 November 2012, the International Ice Hockey Federation (IIHF) ruled that Nylander was eligible to represent Sweden in international play. He went on to compete with Sweden at the 2013 World U-17 Hockey Challenge, where he scored a tournament-high eight assists, leading his team to a gold medal win. In the 2014 IIHF World U18 Championships, Nylander was the standout player of the tournament, winning the scoring race with 16 points in 7 games.

Nylander made his senior team debut at the 2017 IIHF World Championship, where team Sweden won gold. He led his team in scoring with 14 points in 10 games and was named tournament MVP.

Personal life
William was born in Calgary while his father, Michael, was playing for the Calgary Flames. He spent the majority of his youth in the United States where his father played for several NHL teams, spending the summers in Sweden. His family later moved to Sweden when he was 14.

Nylander's younger brother Alex, who was selected eighth overall by the Buffalo Sabres in the 2016 NHL Entry Draft, plays with the Pittsburgh Penguins organization.

Career statistics

Regular season and playoffs

International

Awards and honours

References

External links

1996 births
Living people
Canadian expatriates in the United States
Canadian ice hockey forwards
Canadian people of Swedish descent
Modo Hockey players
National Hockey League first-round draft picks
Rögle BK players
Södertälje SK players
Ice hockey people from Calgary
Swedish expatriates in the United States
Swedish ice hockey forwards
Toronto Maple Leafs draft picks
Toronto Maple Leafs players
Toronto Marlies players